This following people are natives of or lived in Missoula, Montana, but not exclusively as students at the University of Montana.

References 

 
Missoula, Montana
Missoula